The 2013 mid-year rugby union tests (also known as the summer internationals in the Northern Hemisphere) were international rugby union matches that were played in June 2013, mostly in the Southern Hemisphere.

These matches were played in the second year of the global rugby calendar established by the International Rugby Board (IRB), which will run until 2019. They included tests between Northern Hemisphere and Southern Hemisphere nations, whilst some of the touring teams played mid-week matches against provincial or regional sides.

The international window coincided with the 2013 British & Irish Lions tour to Australia, consisting of a three-test series between the Lions and Australia, plus seven non-test matches. South Africa hosted a quadrangular tournament, with Italy, Samoa and Scotland. France toured New Zealand, playing a three-test series and a mid-week match against the Blues. England played a two-test series against Argentina, after a warm-up match against South American XV, made up of players from Argentina, Brazil, Chile and Uruguay. 

Like in 2012, the new global calendar provided expanded Test opportunities for Tier 2 nations. Japan hosted a two-test tour by Wales, their first home matches against a Tier 1 side since their defeat against Italy in 2006. Ireland visited North America, playing one test each against United States and Canada. Argentina played Georgia for the first time on home soil, and for the first time outside the Rugby World Cup.

Overview

Note:
 The South African Quadrangular Tournament was a tournament that consisted of hosts South Africa and three visiting nations; Italy, Scotland and Tier 2 nation Samoa. South Africa beat Samoa in the final.

Other tours

Matches

26 May–2 June

8 June

Notes:
Dan Baker, Dafydd Howells, James King, Rhys Patchell, Emyr Phillips, Andries Pretorius and Owen Williams (all Wales) made their international debuts.

Notes:
This match set a record attendance for a United States home game.

11–15 June

Notes:
 This match was to mark Fiji's centennial celebrations (the Fiji Rugby Union was established in 1913).
 This was a full capped test match for Fiji.

Notes:
 This was Japan's first ever victory over Wales.

Notes:
 This was the 500 test match for the All Blacks in 110 years
 Captaining the All Blacks for the third time, Kieran Read earned his 50th cap in this match.
 This was the first time France has failed to score against the All Blacks.

Notes:
 Winger Christian Wade was named in the starting XV, but was withdrawn following a British & Irish Lions call-up
 First test series win for England in Argentina since 1981 

Notes:
This match set a record attendance for a rugby match on Canadian soil.

22 June

29 June

6 July

South African quadrangular tournament

On 6 December 2012, the SARU announced that South Africa would host Samoa, Italy and Scotland in a four-team tournament. The hosts and Samoa each played Italy and Scotland in a league format. On June 22, the top two teams, South Africa and Samoa, played to determine first and second place, and the bottom two, Scotland and Italy, played for third and fourth place.

Matches

 
Notes:
 Prop Ryan Grant was originally selected at loosehead prop, but was replaced following a call-up for the 2013 British & Irish Lions tour to Australia.
 This was Samoa's first victory over Scotland.

Notes:
 Siya Kolisi (South Africa) made his international debut.

Third-place play-off

Final

See also
Mid-year rugby union test series
2013 end-of-year rugby union tests
2013 British & Irish Lions tour to Australia
2013 Africa Cup
2013 Asian Five Nations
2013 IRB Pacific Nations Cup
2013 IRB Nations Cup
2013 IRB Tbilisi Cup

References

External links
 2013 mid-year rugby union tests at ESPN
 England's South America Tour
 Official Lions website

2013
2012–13 in European rugby union
2012–13 in Japanese rugby union
2013 in Oceanian rugby union
2013 in North American rugby union
2013 in South American rugby union
2013 in South African rugby union